Andreao Heard is a record producer from Greensboro, North Carolina. He produced "Crush on You" for Lil’ Kim and "'Yall Know'" for Will Smith’s ten million seller "Big Willie Style." Discovered by Vincent Herbert, Fanatic moved to New York City, where he connected with P. Diddy and became a part of his "Hitmen" production team and produced records for the Notorious B.I.G. and Ma$e. He then produced the song "Heaven Can Wait" for Michael Jackson. Next, he received recognition from the Grammy association for his participation as a producer on Beyoncé's 2003 GRAMMY Award-winning album "Dangerously in Love,".  Fanatic also contributed as a producer on Anthony Hamilton's 2013 Grammy nominated album "Back To Love".

Contributions to community
In 2019, Heard worked with local artists, community leaders and activists in Greensboro to create the "Artists United to End Poverty" album, which features original material in various genres of music as well as interludes of spoken word. The album was released on September 9, 2019, jointly by Heard's entertainment company, The Culture Pushers and Sixthboro Entertainment, and all proceeds from the sales went to United Way of Greater Greensboro to help end local poverty.

References

External links 
 Instagram Page

Living people
Year of birth missing (living people)
Record producers from North Carolina